Dane Sampson (born 20 August 1986) is an Australian sports shooter. He competed in the 10 metre air rifle, 50 metre rifle three positions and 50 metre rifle prone events at the 2012 Summer Olympics.

Sampson began shooting in 1998, encouraged by his parents who are both sports shooters.  He made his international debut at the 2011 World Cup event in Munich.

He worked as an antiques restorer in order to fund his shooting.

Sampson qualified to represent Australia at the 2020 Summer Olympics. He competed in the men's 10 metre air rifle, the men's 50 metre rifle three positions event, and the mixed 10 metre air rifle team events. He did not score sufficient points in either event to advance past qualification.

References

External links
 

1986 births
Australian male sport shooters
Commonwealth Games gold medallists for Australia
Commonwealth Games medallists in shooting
Living people
Olympic shooters of Australia
Shooters at the 2012 Summer Olympics
Shooters at the 2014 Commonwealth Games
Shooters at the 2016 Summer Olympics
Shooters at the 2018 Commonwealth Games
Sportspeople from Brisbane
Shooters at the 2020 Summer Olympics
21st-century Australian people
Medallists at the 2018 Commonwealth Games